Elena Wagner was the defending champion, but did not compete this year.

Wang Shi-ting won the title by defeating Yi Jing-Qian 6–1, 6–1 in the final.

Seeds

Draw

Finals

Top half

Bottom half

References

External links
 Official results archive (ITF)
 Official results archive (WTA)

1995 WTA Tour
Commonwealth Bank Tennis Classic